Citizens Project is a Colorado Springs-based non-profit organization that promotes equal rights, diversity, and separation of church and state.  It was founded in 1992, and opposed Colorado's Amendment 2, an amendment that would have prohibited laws protecting gays and lesbians from discrimination.

In early 2010, Citizens Project began a campaign in which billboards and bus ads directed people to go to one of four websites: CelebrateConformity.com, ChurchEqualsState.com, CreateIsolation.com, and FreedomFromExpression.com.  Citizens Project, in March, revealed that it was them behind the campaign, hoping that "the campaign [would] start a dialogue about cultural and religious diversity in our community."

Citizens Project also published a yearly Voters Guide in the Colorado Springs Independent.  They campaigned for a "Plus One" initiative in Colorado Springs, which was ultimately defeated due to city budget cuts.  Citizens Project was also at the forefront of the reestablishment of a Human Relations Commission in Colorado Springs.

References

External links
 Citizens Project.org

LGBT political advocacy groups in Colorado
1992 establishments in Colorado